Nalbeelah Creek Wetlands Provincial Park is a provincial park in British Columbia, Canada.

External links

North Coast of British Columbia
Provincial parks of British Columbia
2004 establishments in British Columbia
Protected areas established in 2004